Shahpura is a town, near city of Bhilwara and tehsil headquarters in Bhilwara district in the Indian state of Rajasthan.

Governance 
Shahpura is a Municipality city in the district of Bhilwara, Rajasthan. The Shahpura city is divided into 35 wards for which elections are held every 5 years.

The municipality supplies basic amenities including water and sewerage. It is authorized to build roads and impose property taxes.

Demographics 
In 2011 the Shahpura Municipality had a population of 30,320 of which 15,279 are males and15,041 are females.

Children between the ages of 0-6 number 3997 or 13.18% of the total. The female Sex Ratio is of 984 against state average of 928. The child sex ratio is around 929 compared to state average of 888. The literacy rate is 77.84% higher than state average of 66.11%. The male literacy is around 87.47% while female literacy rate is 68.14%.

Shahpura municipality hosts 5,671 households.

Religion 
The population is 79.83% Hindu, 18.36% Muslim, 0.03% Christian, 0.04% Sikh and 1.71% Jain. Old temples are there.

Economy 
As of 2011 9,986 residents were engaged in work or business, including 7,685 were males and 2,301 females. 89.36% were engaged in main work while 10.64% were engaged in marginal work.

History 

Shahpura is known as the jagir (estate) of Surajmal, second son of Maharana Amir Singh I; their title is 'Raja Dhiraj'.

Many of Mewar's nobles were against Maharana Ari Singh II (1761-1773). Ari Singh wooed Umaid Singh to his side and gave him the Paragna Kachola (District of Kachola). Umaid died at Ujjain, fighting for the Maharana against Madhav Rao Sindhia. In 1869, Nahar Singh, who had been adopted, became the ruler of Shahpura (he had been the son of Balwant Singh of Dhanop). In 1903, the British awarded him the K.C.I.E., and entitled him to a 9-gun salute. He became a member of the Mehdraj Sabha. Later, he refused to go into the service of Maharana Fateh Singh, claiming to be an independent ruler. However, the British ruled that he would have to comply, every second year, and pay Rs. 1 Lakh to the Maharana as a penalty for not attending his court.

A municipality was established at Shahpura in 1939.

Ram Snehi 

Shahpura is a place of pilgrimage for the followers of the Ram Snehi sect. They have a shrine in the town called Ramdwara.  The chief priest there is the head of the sect.  Pilgrims from across the world visit the shrine. A fair called Phooldol Mela continues for five days after Holi. by Ramdwara Temple.

Charbjuja Temple
The temple of Charbhuja Nath is situated in the middle of the city, as well as a Hanuman Temple called Balaji Ki Chatri.

Eight Prachin Jain Temples including four Swetamber Sampradaya and four Digamber Sampradaya.

References 

 Cities and towns in Bhilwara district